My Morning Jacket is the ninth studio album by American rock band My Morning Jacket, released on October 22, 2021, through ATO Records. It is their first album of newly recorded material in six years, following The Waterfall (2015). The album was preceded by the release of the single "Regularly Scheduled Programming".

Recording
The album was recorded at 64 Sound in Los Angeles, with Jim James as producer and engineer.

Critical reception
On review aggregator Metacritic, the album has a score of 80 out of 100 based on five critics' reviews, indicating "generally favorable" reception. Janne Oinonen of The Line of Best Fit found the album to be a "supremely engaging, often blissfully beautiful halfway point between the glossy eccentricities of more recent MMJ albums and those old slow-burn yet highly combustible 'jam band' dynamics".

Track listing

Charts

References

2021 albums
Albums produced by Jim James
ATO Records albums
My Morning Jacket albums